Hunt Independent School District is a public school district based in the community of Hunt, Texas (USA).

The district has one school that serves students in grades pre-kindergarten through eight. High school students attend Ingram-Tom Moore High in the Ingram Independent School District.

In 2009, the school district was rated "recognized" by the Texas Education Agency.

References

External links
 

School districts in Kerr County, Texas